The municipalities of Puerto Rico (Spanish: municipios de Puerto Rico) are the second-level administrative divisions in the Commonwealth of Puerto Rico. There are 78 such administrative divisions covering all 78 incorporated towns and cities. Each municipality is led by a mayor and divided into barrios, third-level administrative divisions, though the latter are not vested with any political authority. Every municipality is governed as stated by the Autonomous Municipalities Act of 1991, which establishes that every municipality must have an elected strong mayor with a municipal legislature as the form of government. Each legislature must be unicameral, with the number of members related to adequate representation of the total population of the municipality. In contrast to other jurisdictions, both the mayors and the municipal legislators are elected on the same date and for the same term of four years in office.

From a political and ekistic perspective, several differences and similarities exist between municipalities of differing population sizes. For instance, municipalities with 50,000 inhabitants or more are considered incorporated cities, while those with fewer than 50,000 are considered incorporated towns. Size affects the autonomy exercised by the jurisdiction: cities provide and manage their own services, while towns typically depend on nearby cities for certain services. Demographically, municipalities in Puerto Rico are equivalent to counties in the United States, and Puerto Rican municipalities are registered as county subdivisions in the United States census. Statistically, the municipality with the largest number of inhabitants is San Juan, with 342,259, while Culebra is the smallest, with around 1,792. Arecibo is the largest in terms of geography, with around 125 mi2, and Cataño the smallest, with around 4.8 mi2.

All municipalities have a barrio called pueblo proper, officially called barrio-pueblo (literally "district-town"), which typically is the site of the historic Spanish colonial settlement, administrative center and urban core of the municipality. Municipalities with large populations, however, may have an urban core that consist of several barrios.

Overview

Just like in Spain, in Puerto Rico the municipality is not "merely a city, but something similar to a wide-extending township in New England—like Plymouth, Massachusetts, or Barnstable, on Cape Cod comprising a central town or city with perhaps several outlying districts or barrios, usually rural in character, and occasionally having sizeable concentrated populations in villages, the municipality bearing the name of the central urban portion and all under one local government." Because Puerto Rico was a Spanish colony until 1898, its system of local government bears more resemblance to that of the Hispanophone nations of the Americas than to local government in the United States. Thus, there are no literal first-order administrative divisions akin to counties, as defined by the U.S. Federal Government; instead, Puerto Rico has 78 municipalities as the secondary unit of administration. For U.S. Census purposes, the municipalities are considered county equivalents. The municipalities are grouped into eight electoral districts, but these do not possess administrative functions. In 1991, the Autonomous Municipalities Act was passed, which slightly modified the rights and responsibilities of Puerto Rican municipalities with the aim of decentralizing control and improving government services.

Every municipality is composed of barrios, except for Florida, which has only one barrio. The municipality of Ponce has the largest number of barrios, 31.

Every municipality (except San Juan) also has an urban area made up of one or more barrios. When the urban area is made up of only one barrio, it is called "Barrio Pueblo". Some urban areas are made up of multiple barrios: Ponce's urban area, for example, is made up of 12 barrios. All of San Juan's barrios are urban barrios, and the municipality of San Juan is composed of urban barrios only - thus, the entire municipality of San Juan consists of one large urban zone.

Politics

The municipalities elect a mayor and a municipal legislature in the general elections every four years.

Municipalities

Racial composition

The following is an alphabetical list of the municipalities and their population together with a breakdown of their racial composition.

Finances
In 2012, 36 of the 78 municipalities (46%) were experiencing a budget deficit. In total, the combined debt carried by the municipalities stands at about US$590 million.

Amalgamation
Multiple times, politicians have discussed and proposed consolidating Puerto Rico's municipalities but so far no proposals has been adopted. In 1902 the Puerto Rico legislature, under pressure from the U.S.-appointed governor of Puerto Rico, passed a law consolidating the then-76 municipalities of Puerto Rico into 46. The law was repealed three years later.  In October 2009, a Puerto Rican legislator proposed a bill that would reduce the current 78 municipalities of Puerto Rico down to 20. The bill called for a referendum to take place on June 13, 2010, which would let the people decide on the matter. However, the bill never made into law. With the Puerto Rican government-debt crisis that emerged in the first half of 2010s, a new plan to consolidate municipalities was again circulated in the legislature in 2017 as a way to alleviate the government debt crisis. In March 2019, then Governor Ricardo Rosselló created an initiative that would preserve the existing municipalities but create regional consolidation by sharing service overhead in the form of counties but he resigned prior to anything coming of his proposal.

See also

 :es:Organización territorial de Puerto Rico

Notes

References

External links

 CIA World Factbook - Puerto Rico
 Municipalities on the west coast of Puerto Rico
 Diario de Puerto Rico official website

 
Puerto Rico
Puerto Rico
Puerto Rico
Puerto Rico geography-related lists